Polish Wedding is a 1998 American comedy-drama film written and directed by Theresa Connelly. It was screened at the Sundance Film Festival on January 16, 1998 and Berlin International Film Festival on February 12. It was released in the U.S. on July 17. It takes place within the Polish American community of Hamtramck, Michigan – the childhood home of director Theresa Connelly – at some time between the 1950s and 1970s. Virtually all characters are Polish Americans, though the actors playing them are mostly of other ethnic origins.  Kristen Bell appears in an uncredited role, making this her film debut.

Synopsis
Jadzia is the matriarch of a family of five children, four sons and a daughter. The household also includes the eldest son's wife – a Syrian-American whom Jadzia calls a Gypsy and who also works with Jadzia – and their child. Jadzia is (somewhat) happily married to Bolek, but is having a long-term relationship with Roman. Her daughter Hala becomes pregnant by a neighborhood cop and her family pressures him to marry her.

The interior of the family's home was shot in a local house on Wyandotte Street in Hamtramck. The St. Florian Church was used as a backdrop.

Cast
 Claire Danes as Hala
 Jon Bradford as Sailor
 Adam Trese as Russell Schuster
 Lena Olin as Jadzia
 Ramsey Krull as Kris
 Gabriel Byrne as Bolek
 Seamus McNally as Heckler
 Daniel Lapaine as Ziggy
 Rachel and Rebecca Morrin as Ziggy and Sofie's Baby
 Mili Avital as Sofie
 Steven Petrarca as Witek
 Brian Hoyt as Kaz
 Christina Romana Lypeckyj as Kasia 
 Peter Carey as Piotrus
 Rade Šerbedžija as Roman
 Kristen Bell as teenage girl (uncredited)

Reception
On Rotten Tomatoes the film has an approval rating of 42% based on reviews from 36 critics.

Home media
The region 1 DVD was released March 16, 1999.

References

External links
 
 
 
 "The Big Lebowski Goes To The Polish Wedding: Polish Americans – Hollywood Style", review  by John J. Bukowczyk
 

1998 films
1998 comedy-drama films
American comedy-drama films
American independent films
1990s English-language films
Teenage pregnancy in film
Films about weddings in the United States
Films produced by Tom Rosenberg
Films set in Michigan
Films shot in Michigan
Fox Searchlight Pictures films
Lakeshore Entertainment films
Polish-American culture in Metro Detroit
1998 independent films
1990s American films